Horní Olešnice is a municipality and village in Trutnov District in the Hradec Králové Region of the Czech Republic. It has about 300 inhabitants.

Administrative parts
The village of Ždírnice is an administrative part of Horní Olešnice.

References

Villages in Trutnov District